The 2024 North Carolina Republican presidential primary will be held on March 5, 2024, as part of the Republican Party primaries for the 2024 presidential election. 75 delegates to the 2024 Republican National Convention will be allocated on a proportional basis. The contest will be held on Super Tuesday alongside primaries in 14 other states.

Candidates 
Former president Donald Trump and former South Carolina governor and U.S. Ambassador to the United Nations Nikki Haley are the only main contenders to officially announce their candidacy so far, although Florida governor Ron DeSantis is widely expected to announce his candidacy as soon as May 2023.

Endorsements

Polling

See also 
 2024 Republican Party presidential primaries
 2024 United States presidential election
 2024 United States presidential election in North Carolina
 2024 United States elections

Notes 

Partisan clients

References 

North Carolina Republican primaries
Republican presidential primary
North Carolina